Matlock Rose, born Berry Matlock Rose (1924–2008), was a professional horse trainer for over 60 years.  He established a reputation as an all-around cowboy and trainer of champions. Rose was often described as stonefaced, a man of few words, but long held the respect of his peers. He was referred to as a trainers' trainer, and considered a legend.  He trained multiple AQHA world champions, five NCHA world champions, was inducted into the American Quarter Horse Hall of Fame in 2001, as well as both the NCHA Rider Hall of Fame and the NCHA Members Hall of Fame. The first famous cutting horse he trained was Jesse James and many other great horses followed but he was best known for training Peppy San and Peponita.

Early life
He was the only son of five children born to Pauline and Sam Rose. Sam farmed oats, wheat, maize and corn, and also raised cattle. As a small boy, Matlock often rode double in the saddle with his father to check cattle. He grew up working on the family ranch under his father's guidance, which is where he learned horsemanship and developed his early skills as a trainer. He knew how to shoe horses, and train them in various disciplines but he was particularly fond of calf roping and cutting. He was also a good competitor as he demonstrated early on in high school playing catcher on a championship baseball team. After graduating, he served in the U.S. Navy during World War II.

Early career
Matlock trained and showed many horses in various performance disciplines to earn their championships, including halter, reining, roping and cutting in AQHA horse show competition.  He also competed successfully in NCHA cutting horse events.

After his service in the Navy, Matlock returned to ranch work and secured his first major job training Quarter Horses at 3D's Stock Farm for W.T. Waggoner from 1946 to 1948. At the time, Bob Burton was foreman of the horse division, and Pine Johnson, who trained and showed Poco Bueno, was their cutting horse trainer. His next job was at Lester Goodson's J3 Ranch in Magnolia, Texas. It was at J3 Ranch that he and Bubba Cascio worked together and became longtime friends.

Matlock left J3 Ranch and went to work for Ben Fussell who had purchased Jessie James. The pair were reunited and ended the year with an NCHA Reserve World Championship.

From 1953 to 1958, Matlock worked for B.F. Phillips at the Phillips Ranch, Frisco, Texas. He showed horses in AQHA halter and performance events, the latter of which including roping and cutting. In 1957, he showed Steel Bars at halter to earn the AQHA High Point Halter Stallion award. His next job was with Pinehurst Ranch for Edgar Brown III of Houston, Texas, until 1959 when he partnered with George Tyler, Gainesville, Texas. They advertised their horse business in the Quarter Horse Journal using the slogan, "Our horses are broke, and we are too." From 1960 to 1963, Matlock worked at the G.B. Howell Ranch in Seagoville, Texas, and "had great influence on both the cutting and Quarter Horse worlds." It was in 1962 at the NCHA Futurity that Matlock rode Peppy San to win Reserve Futurity Open Champion. In 1963, Howell dispersed his Quarter Horse business.

Rose Ranch
In 1964, Matlock established the Matlock Rose Ranch located north of Gainesville, Texas. A year later, he purchased a cutting mare named Stardust Desire in partnership with his long time friend George Tyler. She eventually sold to the Douglas Lake Cattle Company, Ltd. owned by C.N. "Chunky" Woodward, a Canadian rancher and businessman. Matlock continued to show the mare for Woodward and in 1966, the pair won their first NCHA World Championship. In 1967, Matlock was reunited with Peppy San, the senior sire for Woodward's Douglas Lake Cattle Company. The pair won the 1967 NCHA World Championship.

Personal life
Matlock's son, Sam, was the result of his previous marriage to "Freddie" Bush Rose (1927 - 2004), sister to Stanley Bush, NCHA Rider Hall of Fame (1989) and NCHA Members Hall of Fame Honoree (2003). His second marriage was to Joy Fields, and resulted in two daughters, Julie and Judy.  His third marriage was to Carol Ramsey in 1968, and they resided on Matlock's training and Quarter Horse breeding facility in Gainesville, Texas, where they stood several world champion stallions, including Peppy San and Zan Parr Bar, both of whom were inducted into the AQHA Hall of Fame. Matlock and Carol hauled together on the show circuit competing in NCHA and AQHA sponsored events throughout the US. They divorced in 1984, and as part of the divorce settlement, Carol kept Zan Parr Bar and Genuine Doc, while Matlock took Peppy San and Peponita and relocated to Van, Texas. He later met and married LaVerne Johnson.

Major career wins

1951 NCHA Reserve World Champion riding Jesse James 
1966 World Champion riding Stardust Desire 
1967 NCHA World Champion and NCHA Tournament of Champions Champion riding Peppy San 
1968 NCHA Top Ten and NCHA Tournament of Champions Champion riding Christmas Four
1969 NCHA Futurity Winner riding Cee Bars Joan
1970 NCHA Top Ten riding Moira Girl
1971 NCHA Top Ten riding Gay Bars Gen
1974 NCHA Derby Co-Champion riding Chucky's Monkey
1975 NCHA World Champion riding Peppy's Desire
1976 NCHA (twice) Top Ten riding Chunky's Monkey and Peponita 
1978 AQHA World Champion Senior Cutting Horse riding Peponita 
1979 NCHA World Champion and NCHA Finals Champion riding Peponita.

References

Western horse trainers
American Quarter Horse owners and breeders
1924 births
2008 deaths
NCHA Hall of Fame (riders)
People from Little Elm, Texas
AQHA Hall of Fame (members)
United States Navy personnel of World War II